The 1892 Vermont gubernatorial election took place on September 6, 1892. Incumbent Republican Carroll S. Page, per the "Mountain Rule", did not run for re-election to a second term as Governor of Vermont. Republican candidate Levi K. Fuller defeated Democratic candidate B. B. Smalley to succeed him.

Results

References

Vermont
1892
Gubernatorial
September 1892 events